Doodle is an online calendar tool for time management and coordinating meetings. 

Users are asked to determine the best time and date to meet. The organizer then chooses the time that suits everyone and the meeting is booked in the user's calendar. Meeting coordinators (administrators) receive e-mail alerts for votes and comments. Registration is required to have this function.

Ownership and business relationships 
It is based in Zürich, Switzerland and has been operational since 2007. It has offices in Berlin, Tel Aviv, and Belgrade. In 2014 Swiss media giant Tamedia increased its share in Doodle to 100 percent. 

Doodle acquired Meekan in 2016. Meekan is a chatbot developed in Israel and uses artificial intelligence and natural language processing to schedule meetings. Doodle has since begun to integrate this technology into their products. Meekan subsequently was shut down in 2019.

Usage 
In 2014, they passed the 20 million monthly user benchmark.

In 2016, Doodle was used by more than 180 million unique users in 175 different countries.

Operating systems and integration 
Doodle released its Android and iOS apps in 2014. 

Doodle interacts with various external calendar systems. Google Calendar, Yahoo Calendar, Microsoft Outlook, and Apple iCal can be used with Doodle to track dates. Google Maps may also be used to share the location of the event. In November 2018, Doodle 1:1 was launched, allowing users to easily schedule one-on-one meetings.

References

External links 
 
 Free and Open Source Software alternative : https://framadate.org/abc/en/

Internet properties established in 2007
Meetings
Multilingual websites
Swiss websites
Date-matching software